Phytomyza erigerophila is a species of leaf miner fly in the family Agromyzidae. It is found in Europe.

References

Phytomyza
Articles created by Qbugbot
Insects described in 1927